Aston Pigott is a hamlet approximately 12 miles west of Shrewsbury within the parish of Worthen and Shelve. The current population stands at around 50.

The hamlet is situated on a small rise giving many of the properties an outstanding view across the Rea Brook valley to the Stiperstones.

It contains two working farms that are mainly dairy and lamb farms. The hamlet is served primarily by Worthen which is 1 mile to the west. It adjoins Aston Rogers.

The name Aston Pigott probably evolved from East Tun or Town and from the name of the Picot family of Norman descent. In 1180 Ralph Fitz Picot was granted lands by the Corbets, and it was Ralph's descendants, notably Robert Pigot in 1255 followed by Howel Pigot who established the modern village name.

Mains water arrived in 1947 and mains electricity in 1948.

See also
Listed buildings in Worthen with Shelve

References

External links
 Aston Pigott Scrapbook 

Villages in Shropshire